Dance with My Father is the thirteenth and final studio album by American R&B/soul singer Luther Vandross. It was released by J Records on June 10, 2003 in the United States. The album, especially its title track, was dedicated to Vandross' late father and features production credits from Nat Adderley Jr., Shep Crawford, and Marcus Miller as well as guest appearances by singer Beyoncé, R&B trio Next, and rappers Foxy Brown, Queen Latifah, and Busta Rhymes.

Upon its release, Dance with My Father debuted atop the US Billboard 200 chart with first week sales of 442,000 units, becoming his first and only album to do so. It also marked his eighth and first album in the twelve years to top the Top R&B/Hip-Hop Albums chart. Critically acclaimed, Dance with My Father earned Vandross two American Music Awards in the Favorite Soul/R&B Male Artist and the Favorite Soul/R&B Album categories as well as four Grammy Awards wins out of five nominations, including Song of the Year and Best Male R&B Vocal Performance for "Dance with My Father", Best R&B Performance by a Duo or Group with Vocals for "The Closer I Get to You", his duet with Beyoncé, and Best R&B Album.

Critical reception

Dance with My Father was released to generally positive reviews from music critics. In his review for Allmusic, David Jeffries summed that "Dance with My Father isn't able to maintain the high standards it often achieves, but Vandross' voice is always compelling and the background singers live up to the superior arrangements throughout. With nearly 70 minutes of music on the disc to choose from, more savvy listeners will be able to program their CD players for a more focused and rewarding listen." He rated the album four out of five stars. Writing for The Guardian, Adam Sweeting declared the album "one of Vandross's very finest recordings." He found that "always a class act, a kind of top-of-the-range Lexus among soulmen, Vandross has clung to his traditional strengths – lush melodies and artful arrangements, sung with that elegantly beseeching voice – while incorporating some discreet nods to modernity."

Track listing

Sample credits
"Lovely Day (Part II)" contains excerpts from the composition "Say Yeah" as performed by The Commodores.

Personnel
Adapted from AllMusic.

 Nat Adderley Jr. – arranger, keyboards, piano, producer, string arrangements
 Tawatha Agee – background vocals
 Sanford Allen – concert master
 Alli – art direction
 June Ambrose – stylist
 Skip Anderson – arranger, keyboards, programming, soloist, vibraphone
 Ray Bardani – engineer, mixing, string engineer
 Beyoncé – primary artist
 Big Bub – background vocals
 Jeff Bova – sound design
 Al Brown – string contractor
 Al Brown & His Tunetoppers – string contractor
 Foxy Brown – featured artist, guest artist, vocals
 Sharon Bryant – background vocals
 Busta Rhymes – featured artist, guest artist, vocals
 Shep Crawford – instrumentation, producer
 Carl Cyrius – assistant engineer
 Jason Dale – assistant engineer
 Jill Dell'Abate – production coordination
 DJ Kay Gee – remix producer
 James Ervin – choreographer
 Jim Ervin – choreographer
 Eddie F. – remix producer
 Paul J. Falcone – vocal engineer, vocal recording
 Phil Hamilton – guitar
 Reggie Hamilton – bass
 Ivan Hampden – arranger, drum programming, drums, keyboard programming
 Cissy Houston – guest artist, background vocals
 Loren Howard – mixing assistant
 Roger Innocent – hair stylist
 Michael J – background vocals
 Paul Jackson Jr. – guitar
 Brion James – guitar
 Chris James – piano
 Joyce James – performer, background vocals
 Bashiri Johnson – percussion
 Jeff Jones – hair stylist, make-Up
 Beyoncé Knowles – primary artist
 Chris LeBeau – art producer, artwork
 Darren Lighty – remix producer
 Richard Marx –  drum programming, keyboard programming
 Michael McCoy – assistant engineer
 Rick McDonald – background vocals
 Daniel Milazzo – assistant engineer
 Byron Miller – bass
 Marcus Miller – arranger, drum programming, engineer, keyboard programming, producer, background vocals
 Claudius Mittendorfer – assistant engineer
 Cindy Mizelle – background vocals
 Robbie Nevil –  guitar, keyboards
 Flip Osman – assistant engineer
 April Owens – group member, performer, background vocals
 Dave Perini – assistant engineer
 James Porte – arranger, drum programming, keyboard programming
 Herb Powers Jr. – mastering
 Queen Latifah – featured artist, guest artist, primary artist, vocals
 Jerome Ramos – bass
 Rex Rideout – arranger, drum programming, keyboard programming
 RL – background vocals
 Matt Snedecor – assistant engineer
 Jason Stasium – assistant engineer
 Max Szadek – assistant, personal assistant
 Candace Thomas – group member, performer, background vocals
 Fonzi Thornton –   vocal contractor, background vocals
 Luther Vandross –   executive producer, primary artist, producer, vocal arrangement, vocals, background vocals
 Gabriel Varde – engineer, tracking
 Víctor Vega – guitar
 Reed Vertelney – arranger, drum programming, keyboard programming
 Jamie Wallace – assistant engineer
 Stan Wallace – engineer
 Rick Watford – guitar
 Ricky Watford "Bishop" – guitar
 Kevin Westenberg – photography
 Brenda White-King – background vocals
 James "D-Train" Williams – background vocals
 Jay Williams – guitar
 Stevie Wonder – guest artist, harmonica, soloist
 "You Can Ask" Giz – engineer, mixing

Charts

Weekly charts

Year-end charts

Certifications

Award

|-
| rowspan="2" | 2003 || rowspan="2" | American Music Award || Favorite Soul/R&B Album || 
|-
| Favorite Soul/R&B Male Artist || 
|-
| rowspan="13" | 2004 || BET Awards || Best Male R&B Artist || 
|-
| rowspan="5" | Grammy Award || Song of the Year || 
|-
| Best Male R&B Vocal Performance || 
|-
| Best R&B Song || 
|-
| Best R&B Performance by a Duo or Group with Vocals || 
|-
| Best R&B Album || 
|-
| rowspan="4" | NAACP Image Awards || Outstanding Album || 
|-
| Outstanding Male Artist || 
|-
| Outstanding Music Video || 
|-
| Outstanding Song || 
|-
| rowspan="3" | Soul Train Music Awards || Best Album of the Year || 
|-
| Best R&B/Soul Album – Male || 
|-
| Best R&B/Soul Single – Male || 
|-
| 2005 || Soul Train Music Awards || Best R&B/Soul Single – Group, Band or Duo || 
|}

References

2003 albums
J Records albums
Luther Vandross albums
Albums produced by Richard Marx
Albums produced by Luther Vandross
Albums produced by Marcus Miller
Grammy Award for Best R&B Album